The Roman Catholic Archdiocese of Kigali is an ecclesiastical territory or diocese of the Roman Catholic Church in Rwanda. It was erected from the Archdiocese of Kabgayi by Pope Paul VI on April 10, 1976, with the suffragan sees of Butare, Byumba, Cyangugu, Gikongoro, Kabgayi, Kibungo, Nyundo, Ruhengeri. It is the only archdiocese within Rwanda.

The motherchurch of the archdiocese and thus seat of its archbishop is St. Michael's Cathedral.

Bishops

List of archbishops of Kigali
Vincent Nsengiyumva (1976–1994)
 (9 March 1996–19 November 2018)
Antoine Kambanda (19 November 2018 -

Other priests of this diocese who became bishops
Célestin Hakizimana, appointed Bishop of Gikongoro in 2014
Anaclet Mwumvaneza, appointed Bishop of Nyundo in 2016

See also
Roman Catholicism in Rwanda
List of Roman Catholic dioceses in Rwanda

References

Additional sources
"Church Politics and the Genocide in Rwanda", Timothy Longman, Journal of Religion in Africa, Vol. 31, Fasc. 2, Religion and War in the 1990s (May, 2001), pp. 163–186

External links

Catholic-Hierarchy
GCatholic.org

Kigali
Christian organizations established in 1976
Roman Catholic dioceses in Rwanda
Roman Catholic dioceses and prelatures established in the 20th century
1976 establishments in Rwanda